Donald Duane "Coach D" Turner (December 12, 1930 – April 18, 2007) was an American football coach. He served in a variety coaching roles at number of high schools and colleges.

Turner was the head coach at the University of Minnesota Morris in Morris, Minnesota (1972), United States International University—now known as Alliant International University—in California (1973–1974), Bemidji State University in Bemidji, Minnesota (1975–1977), Eastern Oregon University in La Grande, Oregon (1978–1983), Chadron State College in Chadron, Nebraska (1984–1986), the University of Dubuque in Dubuque, Iowa (1987–1989), and Bethany College in Bethany, West Virginia (1990–1992).

Turner's 1980 team at Eastern Oregon won the Evergreen Conference championship.

After leaving the college game, Turner was an assistant coach and a head coach at a number of high schools, including North Mason High School in Mason County, Washington.

Head coaching record

College

Notes

References

External links
 

1930 births
2007 deaths
Bemidji State Beavers football coaches
Bethany Bison football coaches
Chadron State Eagles football coaches
Dubuque Spartans football coaches
Eastern Oregon Mountaineers football coaches
Minnesota Morris Cougars athletic directors
Minnesota Morris Cougars football coaches
UC Santa Barbara Gauchos football coaches
United States International Gulls football coaches
High school football coaches in Washington (state)
Junior college football coaches in the United States
Monmouth College alumni
Illinois State University alumni
United States Air Force personnel of the Korean War
United States Air Force airmen
People from Monmouth, Illinois